Nature Valley is an American brand of bars, snacks and granola owned by General Mills.

They produce a variety of granola bars, cereals and related snacks. Common bars include: 'Oats and Honey', 'Fruit and Nut', and 'Peanut'. Their selection includes crunchy bars, protein bars, fruit and nut bars, and various nut bars.

History 

Nature Valley introduced its granola bar in 1975. The brand later introduced more types of granola bars such as: crunchy, chewy, clusters, nut, yogurt coated and protein packed.

References

External links
Nature Valley Granola Bars
Wheres Yours? contest

General Mills brands

Brand name snack foods
Products introduced in 1975